Mount Glory ( is located in the Teton Range, Caribou-Targhee National Forest, in the U.S. state of Wyoming. The peak is situated just north of Teton Pass.

References

Mountains of Wyoming
Mountains of Teton County, Wyoming